is the name given to the concept of converting  narrow gauge railway lines to  standard gauge for use by shinkansen train services in Japan. Unlike the high-speed Shinkansen lines, the mini-shinkansen lines have a maximum speed of only . Two mini-shinkansen routes have been constructed: the Yamagata Shinkansen and Akita Shinkansen.

Concept
The mini-shinkansen concept was first developed in JNR days, but was not formally proposed until November 1987, following the formation of East Japan Railway Company (JR East). The concept involved regauging existing  gauge lines to standard gauge and linking them to the Shinkansen network to allow through-running. While the track gauge was widened, the loading gauge remained unchanged, requiring the construction of new Shinkansen trains with a narrower cross-section. These would be capable of running at high speed (the E6 series trains have a maximum speed capability of 320 km/h) on Shinkansen tracks, either on their own or coupled to full-sized sets, and run at conventional narrow-gauge speeds (around 130 km/h) on the mini-shinkansen tracks. Speeds on converted lines would also be raised where possible.

Yamagata Shinkansen

The first mini-shinkansen route to be built was the Yamagata Shinkansen, converted from the 87.1 km section of the Ōu Main Line between Fukushima on the Tohoku Shinkansen and Yamagata in Yamagata Prefecture. Work started in 1988, with Yamagata Shinkansen services commencing on 1 July 1992. Services were operated by a new fleet of 400 Series Shinkansen trains, at up to 240 km/h on the Tōhoku Shinkansen and 130 km/h on the Yamagata Shinkansen section.

Akita Shinkansen

Following the success of the Yamagata Shinkansen conversion, a scheme was proposed to construct a second mini-shinkansen route from Morioka in Iwate Prefecture, then the northern terminus of the Tohoku Shinkansen, with Akita in Akita Prefecture. This involved regauging the 75.6 km Tazawako Line from Morioka to Ōmagari and 51.7 km of the Ōu Main Line from Ōmagari to Akita. This opened on 22 March 1997 with Komachi services using new E3 Series Shinkansen trains.
On 16 March 2013, E6 series trains entered service on this line, initially at a maximum speed of 300 km/h on the Tohoku Shinkansen section. In March 2014, the maximum speed on the Tohoku Shinkansen was increased to 320 km/h.

Rolling stock

The following rolling stock was built for use on mini-shinkansen lines.

 400 Series Shinkansen, Yamagata Shinkansen (in service 1992-2010)
 E3 Series Shinkansen, Akita Shinkansen (in service 1997-2014) and Yamagata Shinkansen (from 1999)
 E926 East i track and overhead wire inspection train (from 2001)
 E955 Fastech 360Z experimental test train (2006-2008)
 E6 Series Shinkansen, introduced on the Akita Shinkansen in March 2013

Future rolling stock 
 E8 Series Shinkansen, to be introduced on the Yamagata Shinkansen from 2024 onwards

See also
 Gauge Change Train, an experimental train designed to operate on both narrow-gauge and standard-gauge routes
 Super Tokkyū, a concept of building narrow-gauge lines to Shinkansen standards

References

Shinkansen
Railway services introduced in 1992